The 1977 Chatham Cup was the 50th annual nationwide knockout football competition in New Zealand.

Early stages of the competition were run in three regions (northern, central, and southern), with the National League teams receiving a bye until the Fourth Round of the competition. In all, 142 teams took part in the competition. Note: Different sources give different numberings for the rounds of the competition: some start round one with the beginning of the regional qualifications; others start numbering from the first national knock-out stage. The former numbering scheme is used in this article.

The 1977 final
Nelson United became the first team from outside the four main urban centres to win the cup since 1962. Their winning team contained several players who were to make a considerable mark on New Zealand soccer, either as players or administrators, among them Kevin Fallon, Kenny Cresswell, Peter Simonsen, and Keith Mackay. Against them was a Mount Wellington side containing the likes of Ron Armstrong, Brian Turner, Tony Sibley, and Earle Thomas.

The final was low-scoring but not without excitement. The only goal came early in the second half when referee John Perkins pointed to the spot after a foul on Nelson's David Powdrell by Stewart Carruthers. The penalty was converted by John Enoka giving Nelson a one-goal lead they never relinquished.

Results

Third Round

* Won on penalties by Waterside (4-2) and Wanganui East (3-2)

Fourth Round

Fifth Round

* Won on penalties by Christchurch Technical (14-13), Courier Rangers (5-3), Gisborne (?-?), North Shore (2-1), and Nelson United (5-4)

Quarter-finals

Semi-finals

Final

References

Rec.Sport.Soccer Statistics Foundation New Zealand 1977 page
UltimateNZSoccer website 1977 Chatham Cup page

Chatham Cup
Chatham Cup
Chatham Cup
September 1977 sports events in New Zealand